The 1949 Cork Intermediate Hurling Championship was the 40th staging of the Cork Intermediate Hurling Championship since its establishment by the Cork County Board in 1909.

Carrigtwohill won the championship following a 3-10 to 3-05 defeat of Newtownshandrum in the final. This was their second championship title overall and their first title since 1909.

References

Cork Intermediate Hurling Championship
Cork Intermediate Hurling Championship